John Holroyd may refer to:

 John Holroyd (cricketer) (1907–1975), English sportsman
 John Holroyd (civil servant) (1935–2014), English government official